"By Your Side" is a song by British record producer Jonas Blue, featuring vocals from Raye. It was released as a digital download in the United Kingdom on 28 October 2016. It is the third single of his debut album Blue. A remix by PBH & Jack Shizzle was included on Blue's compilation album, Jonas Blue: Electronic Nature – The Mix 2017. "By Your Side" was written by Zee, Grace Barker, the Invisible Men, and Blue, who also produced the song.

Music video
The official music video premiered on 16 November 2016 on YouTube via Jonas Blue's official Vevo channel.

Track listing

Charts

Weekly charts

Year-end charts

Certifications

Release history

References

 

2016 songs
2016 singles
Jonas Blue songs
Raye (singer) songs
Songs written by Jon Shave
Songs written by Jason Pebworth
Songs written by George Astasio
Songs written by Jonas Blue